Ann Marie Sarnoff (née Misiaszek; born c. 1961) is an American television executive. She became the chairwoman and CEO of Warner Bros. in the summer of 2019. Sarnoff was the first woman to hold the position at the company.

Early life and education
Sarnoff was born in Massachusetts. She is a 1979 graduate of Minnechaug Regional High School in Wilbraham, Massachusetts.

In 1983, Sarnoff received a Bachelor of Science degree in marketing from McDonough School of Business from Georgetown University. In 1987, Sarnoff received a Master of Business Administration degree from Harvard Business School.

Career
Sarnoff started out as a strategic consultant at Marakon Associates.

From 1993 to 2003, Sarnoff worked at Viacom. Her first job at Viacom was in the corporate development department. After leaving corporate, Sarnoff was the head of Nickelodeon consumer products and business development during Geraldine Laybourne's leadership of the company. In 1999, while working at Nickelodeon, Sarnoff was part of a team that created the TV channel Noggin, a joint venture between Nickelodeon and Sesame Workshop. Sarnoff also helped create the television channel TV Land, which started off as Nick at Nite's TV Land in 1996. Two shows she promoted were Rugrats and Blue's Clues. Sarnoff served as executive vice-president of business strategy and program enterprises at VH1.

In 2001, she became chief operating officer of VH1 and Country Music Television, with the task of integrating the two channels. During her time at VH1, Sarnoff launched the TV channel, VH1 Classic.

In February 2004, Sarnoff was chief operating officer of the Women's National Basketball Association.

In 2006, Sarnoff joined Dow Jones Ventures as president and senior vice president of strategy, a position she held for four years. In this position, she ran the executive conference business for The Wall Street Journal.

From 2010 to 2015, Sarnoff was chief operating officer of BBC Worldwide North America, where she worked with Herb Scannell, who she had worked with at Nickelodeon. In August 2015, Sarnoff became president of BBC Studios Americas, formerly known as BBC Worldwide Americas. In 2015, she launched the subscription TV channel, BBC Earth, and promoted shows like Doctor Who, Top Gear, Dancing with the Stars, Sherlock, Orphan Black, and Killing Eve. From 2016 to 2018, Sarnoff was head of BBC Worldwide's Global Production Network. In 2017, she launched Britbox, a streaming service for North America.

In the summer of 2019, Sarnoff became the first woman CEO of Warner Bros, a subsidiary of WarnerMedia. Sarnoff succeeded Kevin Tsujihara and reported to John Stankey. Toby Emmerich, the head of Warner Bros. Pictures; Peter Roth, who is the head of the Warner Bros. television group; and Kim Williams, executive VP and chief financial officer of Warner Bros. who oversaw Otter Media, reported to Sarnoff in her position as head of Warner Bros. On April 8, 2022, she stepped down from her role upon the merger of WarnerMedia and Discovery, Inc.

Personal life
In 1990, Sarnoff married Richard Sarnoff, a former media executive who works in private equity. They live in New York City and have two children. She relocated to Los Angeles for her position at Warner Bros.

Sarnoff's husband's great uncle, David Sarnoff, was the long-time chairman of RCA, a pioneer of American television and radio, and was known as "The General" or "General Sarnoff". He is credited with founding NBC in 1926 and RKO Radio Pictures in 1928.

Boards and memberships
 ART:21, board member (former)
 2017–present: Britbox, chairman of board
 2017–present: BritishAmerican Business, international advisory board
 2018–present: Georgetown University, board of directors
 2008–present: Georgetown University, McDonough School of Business, board of advisors, executive committee vice chair
 Harvard Business School Women's Association of New York, board member
 2012–present: HSN, Inc., board member
 2017–present: PayPal Holdings, Inc., board member
 New York Public Radio, co-chair of digital task force
 The Women's Forum of New York, board of directors, vice president; 2004–present: Member
 2022–present: Motion Picture & Television Fund, board member

Honors
 2011–2018: CableFAX Magazine, one of the Most Powerful Women in Cable
 2012: Harvard Business School, Inspiring Women Award
 2017: The Women's Project Theater, Women of Achievement Award
 2019: Georgetown University, Georgetown Media Alliance, Wall Street Alliance, Honoree

Works and publications

References

External links
 Ann Sarnoff at BBC Studios - Americas
 

1961 births
Living people
American business executives
Georgetown University alumni
Harvard Business School alumni
Dow Jones & Company people
Nickelodeon executives
Women television executives
Warner Bros. people
PayPal people
21st-century American businesspeople
21st-century American non-fiction writers
21st-century American women writers
People from Wilbraham, Massachusetts
21st-century American businesswomen